Matt Margetts (born January 15, 1988) is a Canadian freestyle skier. He represented Canada at the 2014 Winter Olympics in the halfpipe event. Margetts placed 15th.

References

1988 births
Living people
Canadian male freestyle skiers
Freestyle skiers at the 2014 Winter Olympics
Olympic freestyle skiers of Canada
Sportspeople from Victoria, British Columbia
Superpipe skiers